Jijoy P R is an Indian film and theatre actor. He is an associate professor at the Film and Television Institute of India (FTII), Pune and is currently serving as the Dean of the Films Division too. He is an international theatre artist who performed 380 shows in Japan, the United Kingdom, Italy, the United States, Canada, and Australia.

Early life and education

Jijoy P. R did his schooling at Sree Narayana Higher Secondary School, Irinjalakuda where he developed his artistic interest through music and theatre. He had completed his pre-degree and Bachelor of Arts in economics from Christ College, Irinjalakuda where he was very active in campus theatre and performed a number of plays.  He pursued a Bachelor of Theater Arts specialised in acting in School of Drama and Fine Arts Thrissur. After doing some films and serials he decided to pursue his studies in M.A and M.Phil in drama and theatre arts from Pondicherry University.

Filmography

As dubbing artist

Theatre

Plays acted in

Television

References

External links

https://www.theguardian.com/stage/theatre
http://bufvc.ac.uk/shakespeare/index.php/title/av74546
http://www.canada.com/ottawacitizen/story.html?id=eb4ef504-7bce-469e-a4c4...
http://www.ftiindia.com/Performa/Regular%20Faculty%20_FTII.pdf
http://www.telegraph.co.uk/theatre/
http://www.gulfweekly.com/Articles/27445
https://www.farookcollege.ac.in/board-of-studies-media-of-information-science/
http://collections.shakespeare.org.uk/search/rsc.../mnd200606-a-midsummer-nights-dream
https://www.thestar.com/.../luminato_couldnt_dream_up_a_better_symbol_for_festiv...
http://www.metromatinee.com/artist/4736-jijoy-rajagopalan

1977 births
Living people
Indian male film actors
Indian male stage actors
21st-century Indian male actors